Lara Arruabarrena and Tatjana Maria were the defending champions, but chose not to compete together. Arruabarrena played alongside Mariana Duque Mariño, but lost in the quarterfinals to Verónica Cepede Royg and Magda Linette. Maria teamed up with Natela Dzalamidze, but lost in the quarterfinals to Irina Khromacheva and Nina Stojanović.

Beatriz Haddad Maia and Nadia Podoroska won the title, defeating Cepede Royg and Linette in the final, 6–3, 7–6(7–4).

Seeds

Draw

References
 Main Draw

Copa Colsanitas - Doubles
2017 Doubles